The Holth Peaks are a group of peaks which rise to  in the form of a short northeast–southwest ridge,  northwest of Mount Lymburner near the northern end of the Sentinel Range in the Ellsworth Mountains of Antarctica. They were discovered by Lincoln Ellsworth on his trans-Antarctic flight of November 23, 1935, and were named by the Advisory Committee on Antarctic Names for Baard Holth, captain of the MV ''Wyatt Earp on Ellsworth's first expedition to Antarctica in 1933–34.

See also
 Mountains in Antarctica

References

Ellsworth Mountains
Mountains of Ellsworth Land